The towns and cities of Central New York were created by the U.S. state of New York as municipalities in order to give residents more direct say over local government. Central New York (consisting of the Syracuse Consolidated Metropolitan Statistical Area and the Utica-Rome Metropolitan Statistical Area) is a six county area–Cayuga, Herkimer, Madison, Oneida, Onondaga, and Oswego.

The entire area was nominally under the jurisdiction of Albany County from 1686 until the Royal Proclamation of 1763 but truly under the Iroquois Confederacy until 1777. The area was then nominally Tryon County from 1781 and effectively in 1784 when the county was renamed Montgomery, and then the area was part of Herkimer County from 1791.

In 1794 the western section of Herkimer County was split off as Onondaga County, and then in 1798 the northwestern section of Herkimer was removed as Oneida County and the southwestern section as Chenango County. Cayuga County was removed from Onondaga in 1799, Madison County from Chenango in 1806, and Oswego from Onondaga and Oneida in 1816.

The current towns of Herkimer, Oneida, and Madison counties are descended from the original districts and towns of Montgomery County; whereas the towns of Onondaga and Cayuga counties are descended from the towns erected by the state when Onondaga County was formed from the Military Tract in western Herkimer County which had previously been divided into townships for the purpose of surveying of lands to be sold to veterans of the US Revolutionary War.

New York experimented with different types of municipalities before settling upon the current format of towns and cities occupying all the land in a county, and all previous forms were transformed into towns (or divided into multiple towns) in 1788 when all of the state of New York was divided into towns. Some early forms of government in earlier years included land patents with some municipal rights, districts, precincts, and boroughs. Though originally intended to be mere “…involuntary subdivisions of the state, constituted for the purpose of the more convenient exercise of governmental functions by the state for the benefit of all its citizens” as defined by the courts in 1916 (Short v. Town of Orange), towns gained home rule powers from the state in 1964, at which time towns became "a municipal corporation comprising the inhabitants within its boundaries, and formed with the purpose of exercising such powers and discharging such duties of local government and administration of public affairs as have been, or, maybe [sic] conferred or imposed upon it by law.”

The following is a timeline showing the creation of the current towns from their predecessors stretching back to the earliest municipal entity over the area. The timelines only represent from which town(s) a particular town was created from and does not represent annexations of territory to and from towns that already existed. All municipalities are towns unless otherwise noted as patent, township, borough, district, or city.

Cayuga County

Notes

Prior to the creation of Onondaga County the western section of Herkimer County was the Military Tract. This tract included present-day Onondaga, Cayuga, and Seneca counties, and parts of Oswego, Tompkins, and Wayne; and was divided into 25 townships for surveying purposes to provide land for veterans of the US Revolutionary War. Three more townships were created in order to settle all claims. Originally simply numbered, they latter received names, mostly classical Greek and Roman names. In creating Onondaga County in 1794 the state of New York combined the townships into 11 towns. Milton (17), Locke (18), Scipio (12), Sempronius (13), Cato (3), Brutus (4), and Aurelius (8) were the townships in present-day Cayuga County, which were combined in 1794 into the towns of Milton (Milton and Locke townships), Scipio (Scipio and Sempronius townships), and Aurelius (Cato, Brutus, and Aurelius townships).

Herkimer County

Notes

Madison County

Notes

Oneida County

Notes

The city of Sherrill is considered in some circumstances of law to be a village under the jurisdiction of the town of Vernon.

Onondaga County

Notes
Prior to the creation of Onondaga County the western section of Herkimer County was the Military Tract. This tract included present-day Onondaga, Cayuga, and Seneca counties, and parts of Oswego, Tompkins, and Wayne; and was divided into 25 townships for surveying purposes to provide land for veterans of the US Revolutionary War. Three more townships were created in order to settle all claims. Originally simply numbered, they latter received names, mostly classical Greek and Roman names. In creating Onondaga County in 1794 the state of New York combined the townships into 11 towns. Pompey (10), Tully (14), Fabius (15), Manlius (7), Camillus (5), and Marcellus (9) occupied present-day Onondaga, and were combined as the towns of Pompey (Pompey, Tully, and Fabius townships), Marcellus (Camillus and Marcellus townships), and Manlius.

Oswego County

 

Notes

See also
Administrative divisions of New York
List of cities in New York
List of towns in New York
List of villages in New York
Timeline of town creation in Downstate New York
Timeline of town creation in New York's Capital District
Timeline of town creation in the Hudson Valley

References

 
Utica–Rome metropolitan area
Former municipalities in New York (state)
 
 
History of New York (state)
Syracuse, New York-related lists
Central New York